Jaime I is Spanish for "James I", and may refer to:

Jaime I de Aragón, (1208–1276), a Spanish king
Jaime I of Braganza (1479–1532), a Portuguese duke
Spanish battleship Jaime I (1921–1937)
Jaime VI and I, (1565–1625), an English King